Bee Branch may refer to:

Political divisions 
Bee Branch, Arkansas, an unincorporated community
Bee Branch Township, Chariton County, Missouri, a township in Missouri

Rivers 

Bee Branch Creek (California), a stream in California
Bee Branch Creek (Iowa), a creek in Dubuque, Iowa
Bee Branch (Bridge Creek tributary), a stream in Missouri
Bee Branch (Chariton River tributary), a stream in Missouri
Bee Branch (Cobb Creek tributary), a stream in Missouri
Bee Branch (South Fork Blackwater River tributary), a stream in Missouri